Mallika Srinivasan (born 1959) is an Indian industrialist and is the Chairman and Managing Director of Tractors and Farm Equipment Limited, a tractor major incorporated in 1960 at Chennai, India. She is also the Chairperson of the Public Enterprises Selection Board (PESB) constituted by the Government of India. She is additionally on the Global Board of U.S.-India Business Council (USIBC), and the Boards of AGCO Corporation - United States and Tata Steel Limited. She is a member of the Executive Board of the Indian School of Business, Hyderabad, the Governing Board of the Indian Institute of Technology (IIT), Chennai, Bharathidasan Institute of Management (BIM), Trichy, and a member of the Governing Body of Stella Maris College, Chennai.

Professional 
Mallika Srinivasan established TAFE as a mass manufacturer of tractors. She led the company's growth to its present status with revenues in excess of Rs. 10,000 Crores with diverse interests in tractors, farm machinery, diesel engines, generators, engineering plastics, hydraulic pumps and cylinders, batteries, automobile franchises and plantations.

She led a variety of industry bodies such as the Tractor Manufacturers’ Association of India, the Madras Chamber of Commerce and has held various positions in industry bodies such as the Confederation of Indian Industry and Indian Institute of Foreign Trade.

Philanthropy 
She supports organizations such as the Sankara Nethralaya (a leading eye care organization), the Cancer Hospital in Chennai, and a number of educational and healthcare facilities in Alwarkurichi, Tirunelveli district in South India. She is also a generous patron of the arts through her involvement in the promotion and support of Carnatic music through the Indira Sivasailam Foundation.

Academics 
She earned her degree in Mathematics from the Women's Christian College and later was a university gold-medalist in Econometrics from the University of Madras, she graduated as a member of the Dean's Honor List, and the Alpha Beta Gamma Society, from the Wharton School of Business, University of Pennsylvania, and was ranked as one of its top 125 most successful alumni.

Awards and accolades 

Srinivasan has received a number of accolades and awards. In 2011, she was voted Entrepreneur of the Year by Ernst and Young; awarded the Woman Leader of the Year award by Forbes India; and recognized by Forbes Asia as one of the Top 50 Asian Power Businesswomen.

She was named among the six Most Powerful Women of India Inc. by Business Today, while the Asian Business Leadership Forum (ABLF) honored her with the ABLF Woman of Power Award. NDTV Profit, India's leading business television channel, accorded her the honor of Business Thought Leader of the Year 2012 Award, at the NDTV Profit Business Leadership Awards. In 2018, she was ranked fifth among India's Most Powerful Women in Business by Fortune India. In 2020, she was awarded "Businesswoman of the year" at ET Prime Women Leadership Awards 2020.

Organisations and affiliations

References

1959 births
Indian women chief executives
Indian chief executives
Indian women philanthropists
Indian philanthropists
Living people
Wharton School of the University of Pennsylvania alumni
Businesspeople from Chennai
Automotive industry in India
People in the automobile industry
Recipients of the Padma Shri in trade and industry
20th-century Indian businesspeople
People named in the Panama Papers
21st-century Indian businesspeople
Businesswomen from Tamil Nadu
20th-century Indian businesswomen
21st-century Indian businesswomen
Women's Christian College, Chennai alumni
TVS Group
BBC 100 Women